Queen Athena may refer to:

 Athena (The Little Mermaid), character in the Disney franchise, mother to the protagonist, Ariel

 Queen Athena (Loonatics), character in the Warner Bros. animated TV spin-off series, Loonatics Unleashed